|}
Eric Houguet Poole (10 August 1942 – 18 August 2021) was an Australian politician. He was the Country Liberal Party member for Araluen in the Northern Territory Legislative Assembly from 1986 to 2001. In 1989, his Ministerial portfolio included racing, gaming and tourism. In 1995, he was chairman of a parliamentary committee considering euthanasia. Prior to his election, he acted as Chairman of the Northern Territory Tourism Commission. Poole appears briefly in Cathy Henkel's documentary film Walking Through a Minefield (1999) regarding his involvement in the development of the Jabiluka uranium mine.

Poole died on 18 August 2021 in Bali.

References

1942 births
2021 deaths
Members of the Northern Territory Legislative Assembly
Country Liberal Party members of the Northern Territory Legislative Assembly
21st-century Australian politicians